The Order of Cultural Merit is an honour or decoration awarded by a country. It may refer to:

Order of Cultural Merit (Korea)
Order of Cultural Merit (Monaco)
Order of Cultural Merit (Romania)
Ordem do Mérito Cultural, Brazil

See also

Order of Culture, an Order of Japan
Person of Cultural Merit, an honour of Japan